is a Shingon temple in Kōchi, Kōchi Prefecture, Japan. Temple 31 on the Shikoku 88 temple pilgrimage, the main image is of Monju Bosatsu. The temple is said to have been founded by Gyōki in the early eighth century.

The temple houses a number of important sculptures and its late Edo-period gardens are a Natural Monument.

Buildings
 Hondō, late Muromachi period, 5x5 bay, single storey, with a hip-and-gable shingle roof (Important Cultural Property)
 Reception hall, Edo period (Prefectural Cultural Property)
 Sanmon
 Five-storey pagoda
 Shōrō
 Daishidō

Treasures
 Wooden pentad of Monju Bosatsu (late Heian period) (ICP)
 Standing wooden statue of Amida Nyorai (late Heian period) (ICP)
 Standing wooden statues of Tamonten and Zōjōten (late Heian period) (ICP)
 Seated wooden statue of Yakushi (late Heian period) (ICP)
 Standing wooden statue of Jūichimen Kannon (late Heian period) (ICP)
 Seated wooden statue of Shaka Nyorai (late Heian period) (ICP)
 Standing wooden statue of Seishi Bosatsu (late Heian period) (ICP)
 Wooden statue of Daiitoku Myōō seated on a cow (Kamakura period) (ICP)
 Seated wooden statue of Aizen Myōō (Kamakura period) (ICP)
 Standing wooden statue of Senjū Kannon (Kamakura period) (ICP)
 Seated wooden statue of Amida Nyorai (Kamakura period) (ICP)
 Standing wooden statue of Byakue Kannon (Muromachi period) (ICP)
 Standing wooden statue of Batō Kannon (Muromachi period) (ICP)
 Seated wooden statue of Dainichi Nyorai (Muromachi period) (ICP)
 Kakebotoke with seated Monju Bosatsu (1654) (Prefectural Cultural Property)
 Temple bell (1284) (Prefectural Cultural Property)

See also

 Shikoku 88 temple pilgrimage
 Makino Botanical Garden
 Japanese sculpture

References

External links
  Chikurinji homepage

Buddhist pilgrimage sites in Japan
Buddhist temples in Kōchi Prefecture
Important Cultural Properties of Japan